Vasily Antonovich Kosyakov (1862– 5 September 1921) was a Russian Imperial architect and a specialist of the Neo-Russian and Neo-Byzantine architecture in the Russian Empire.

He is buried at Novodevichy Cemetery, in Saint Petersburg.

Architects from the Russian Empire
Architects from Saint Petersburg
Saint-Petersburg State University of Architecture and Civil Engineering alumni
1862 births
1921 deaths
Art Nouveau architects
Burials at Novodevichy Cemetery (Saint Petersburg)